Unión Juárez is a town and one of the 119 municipalities of Chiapas, in southern Mexico.

As of 2010, the municipality had a total population of 14,089, up from 13,934 as of 2005. It covers an area of 268.3 km².

As of 2010, the town of Unión Juárez had a population of 2,635. Other than the town of Unión Juárez, the municipality had 44 localities, the largest of which (with 2010 populations in parentheses) were: Santo Domingo (3,796), classified as urban, and Once de Abril (1,209), classified as rural.

References

Municipalities of Chiapas